Xylosyltransferase 2 is an enzyme that in humans is encoded by the XYLT2 gene.

Function 

The protein encoded by this gene is an isoform of xylosyltransferase, which belongs to a family of glycosyltransferases. This enzyme transfers xylose from UDP-xylose to specific serine residues of the core protein and initiates the biosynthesis of glycosaminoglycan chains in proteoglycans including chondroitin sulfate, heparan sulfate, heparin and dermatan sulfate.

Clinical significance 

The enzyme activity, which is increased in scleroderma patients, is a diagnostic marker for the determination of sclerotic activity in systemic sclerosis.

Mutations in this gene have been shown to be the cause of the spondylo-ocular syndrome. It has also been implicated as  cofactor in pseudoxanthoma elasticum.

References

Further reading